The New York Police Department's Street Crime Unit (motto: "We Own The Night") was a plainclothes anti-crime unit. The SCU was formed in 1971 as the "City Wide Anti-Crime Unit" and operated for decades tasked with the apprehension of armed felons from the streets of New York City.

History
On January 14, 1999, three weeks before the Diallo incident, two officers from the Street Crimes Unit fired eight shots at rapper Russell "Ol' Dirty Bastard" Jones, a member of the multiplatinum group Wu-Tang Clan. The officers later accused Jones of firing at them after they stopped his car in Bedford–Stuyvesant, Brooklyn. Jones was cleared by a grand jury and insisted that the officers had been scared by his cellular phone. No weapons or shell casings besides those of the officers were found in the vehicle or near the scene.

The unit was disbanded after the outrage spiked in the aftermath of the Amadou Diallo shooting. Four plainclothes New York City officers shot at Diallo 41 times in the vestibule of his apartment complex. While the officers were acquitted on the charges of murder, New York City did pay out 3 million dollars in a civil suit brought forward by Amadou's mother, Kadijatou Diallo. A federal investigation accused the unit of racial profiling and it was subsequently disbanded in 2002.

Methods
From 1971 to 1999, the unit was made up of 60 to 100 members. In 2000 it expanded to 300 members. It employed innovative methods, including possibly the earliest coordinated sting operations to elicit potential muggers. According to Criminal Justice Today: "The SCU disguised officers as potential mugging victims and put them in areas where they were most likely to be attacked." 

The SCU would go into high-crime neighborhoods and make a much larger number of firearms-related arrests in comparison to uniformed patrol officers. In 1973, the SCU won recognition as an Exemplary Project from the U.S. Law Enforcement Assistance Administration. The LEAA was the United States' leading crime-reduction and crime-prevention funding agency. "In its first year, the SCU made nearly 4,000 arrests and averaged a successful conviction rate of around 80%. Perhaps the most telling statistic was the 'average officer day per arrest'." The SCU invested 8.2 days in each arrest, whereas the department average for all uniformed officers was 167 days."

References 

New York City Police Department units
2002 disestablishments in New York (state)

simple:New York City Police Department#Street Crimes Unit